The Nazi Party/Foreign Organization was a branch of the Nazi Party and the 43rd and only non-territorial  ("region") of the Party. In German, the organization is referred to as NSDAP/AO, "AO" being the abbreviation of the German compound word  ("Foreign Organization"). Although  would be correctly written as one word, the Nazis chose an obsolete spelling with a hyphen.

Nazi Party members who lived outside the German Reich were pooled in this special Party department. Only actual citizens of the German Reich with a German passport could become members of the AO. Persons of German descent, ethnic Germans, who possessed the nationality of the country in which they lived, were refused entry to the Nazi Party.

History

In 1928, in Paraguay and in Brazil, party members abroad joined forces for the first time. Similar associations came into being in Switzerland and in the United States in 1930. On August 7, 1931, Local Group Buenos Aires was accepted. Shortly thereafter followed National Committee Paraguay (August 20, 1931) and Local Group Rio de Janeiro (October 5, 1931). From 1932 until its prohibition in 1934 there existed a national committee in the Union of South Africa, which enjoyed great popularity (see German Namibians) and maintained numerous offices in the former German South-West Africa (today Namibia). Nazi Party Local Groups included at least 25 "party comrades", while the so-called  (literally ) had five members or more. Furthermore, large Local Groups could be partitioned into "Blocs".

Ideological training and congruity of all party comrades with the interests of the German nation were the principal tasks of the NSDAP/AO. It was assigned the mandate of uniting all Party members (and members of Nazi Party affiliated organizations) living abroad in a loosely affiliated group and to educate them in the philosophy, ideology and political programs of the Nazi Party for the betterment of Germany. The AO was not a Fifth Column organization and had ten basic principles to be followed that included:
 "Obey the laws of the country in which you are a guest."
 "Let the citizens take care of the internal policy of the country where you are a guest; do not mix in these matters, even by way of conversation."
 "Identify yourself to all, on all occasions, as an NSDAP party member."
 "Always speak and act on behalf of the NSDAP movement, thus doing honor to the new Germany. Be honest, honorable, fearless and loyal."
 "Look out for all your fellow Germans, men of your blood, style and being. Give them a hand, irrespective of their class. We are all creators of our people."

These and the other principles were intended to create a feeling of amiability towards Germans and Germany in general and hopefully convince as many foreigners as possible that the Nazi Party was the right choice for Germany, and as result, the rest of the world.

By country

Costa Rica
The local NSDAP/AO delegation in Costa Rica existed in the 1930s to 1940s, numbered 66 members, and lobbied for Germany during World War II. Its leaders were the engineer Max Effinger, Herbert Knöhr and Karl Bayer. They met at the German Club, which was located on Calle 21, Avenida 1, San José. 

Records of the time, show that there was communication between Berlin and the German community and that there was a deliberate effort by the Third Reich to promote Nazism among the German diaspora in Costa Rica, and in the rest of Latin America. Support of German-Costa Ricans to Nazism was not uniform, apparently the older generations took it with skepticism and many others were open opponents. But it had its support especially among young or German-born Germans. A branch of the Hitler Youth was created led by the director of the German School Hannes Ihring, but had problems being implemented due to the constant questioning of its participants. 

One of the leaders, Max Effinger, was appointed immigration advisor in the government of León Cortés Castro (1936–1940), thus preventing the entry of many Polish Jews fleeing Germany.

Dominican Republic
By the early 1940s, the NSDAP/AO had perhaps around 50 active members in the Dominican Republic, a relatively large number considering that the German-born population in the country stood at around 150 with an additional 300 persons of German descent.

Finland

Auslands-Organisation der NSDAP Landeskreis Finnland was the Finnish local group of the German Nazi party. The Finnish party organization began its activities in 1932, when local German citizens founded the local organization of the Nazi party (Ortsgruppe) in Helsinki. It received support from the party's expatriate organization, the German embassy, the teachers 'and students' union of the German school in Helsinki, and the school's support association. In the mid-1930s, the NSDAP's Finnish country district (Landeskreis) was established, under which, in addition to the Helsinki local group, at least Ortsgruppe Turku and Stützpunkt Tampere operated. As the leader of the Finnish district (Kreisleiter) initially operated businessman Herbert Howaldt until about 1937, when businessman Wilhelm Jahre became the leader. Jahre also served on the boards of the Finnish-German Society, the German Chamber of Commerce and the German School. The party organization had its own internal court that mediated disputes between members. The premises of the party organizations were located at Unioninkatu 7, but meetings, club events and other events were held at the premises of the German colony in the White Hall at Aleksanterinkatu 16–18 or at a German school (Malminkatu 14). The premises of the party organization were moved to Vuorimiehenkatu 7 A in 1943 and to Bulevardi 30 B 6 in June 1944. The National Socialist People's Welfare service organization also had an office at Tehtaankatu 11 B. According to researcher Henrik Ekberg, the Finnish National Socialist parties had occasional contacts with the NSDAP's Finnish local group. Hermann Souchon, known for executing Rosa Luxemburg, worked as Landesgruppenleiter (regional leader) in the Finnish chapter of the NSDAP/AO.

Ireland
Ireland/Éire (known as the Irish Free State until 1937) was neutral during the war (Northern Ireland was and is part of the United Kingdom), and several Germans and Austrians in the country were active in NSDAP/AO. Adolf Mahr, director of the National Museum of Ireland, was also Ortsgruppenleiter of the local Nazi party until 1939; he was succeeded by Heinz Mecking, who was head of the Turf Development Board. The military musician and composer Fritz Brase was also a member.

The AO's duties included monitoring Germans in Ireland, sending reports on Irish events to Berlin, and asserting the dominance of the Nazi Party over other agencies of the German government abroad, such as the Foreign Office (Auswärtiges Amt) which was not seen as sufficiently pro-Nazi. The Irish AO had its own branch of the Hitler Youth and included officials of the Electricity Supply Board. Ireland's intelligence agency G2 monitored NDSAP/AO activity in the country.

Sweden
During the first years of World War II it was led by W. Stengel, but the leadership was later taken over by the German diplomat . There were several  in different parts of Sweden, such as Gothenburg, etc.

See also
 German-American Bund
 Nazi Party (NSDAP)
 NSDAP/AO (1972)
 Germanic SS
 The Swastika Outside Germany

References
Notes

Bibliography
 Balke, Ralf: Hakenkreuz im Heiligen Land : die NSDAP-Landesgruppe Palästina. - Erfurt : Sutton, 2001. - 221 p. : ill. - 
 Ehrich, Emil: Die Auslands-Organisation der NSDAP. - Berlin : Junker u. Dünnhaupt, 1937. - 32 p. - (Schriften der Deutschen Hochschule für Politik : 2, Der organisatorische Aufbau des Dritten Reiches; 13)
 Farías, Víctor: Los nazis en Chile. - Barcelona : Seix Barral, 2000. - 586 p. : ill., ports. - 
 Gaudig, Olaf: Der Widerschein des Nazismus : das Bild des Nationalsozialismus in der deutschsprachigen Presse Argentiniens, Brasiliens und Chiles 1932 - 1945. - Berlin; Mannheim : Wissenschaftlicher Verl., 1997. - 538 p. - . - (Originally presented as the author's thesis (doctoral) - Berlin, Freie Univ., 1994/95). - EUR 57,00
 Grams, Grant W.(2021). Return Migration of German Nationals from the United States and Canada, 1933–1941, Jefferson, North Carolina, McFarland Publications.
 Jong, Louis de: The German fifth column in the Second World War / translated from the Dutch by C.M. Geyl. - Rev. ed. - London : Routledge, 1956. - 308 p. : maps. - (Translation of: De Duitse vijfde colonne in de Tweede Wereldoorlog)
 Lachmann, Günter: Der Nationalsozialismus in der Schweiz 1931 - 1945 : ein Beitrag zur Geschichte der Auslandsorganisation der NSDAP. - Berlin-Dahlem : Ernst-Reuter-Gesellschaft, 1962. - 107 p. - (Originally presented as the author's thesis (doctoral) - F.U. Berlin, Dec. 18, 1962)
 McKale, Donald M.: The swastika outside Germany. - Kent, Ohio : Kent State Univ. Press, 1977. - xvi, 288 p. - 
 Moraes, Luís Edmundo de Souza: "Konflikt und Anerkennung: Die Ortsgruppen der NSDAP in Blumenau und Rio de Janeiro." Berlin: Metropol Verlag, 2005. 296 p. -  (Originally presented as the author's thesis (doctoral) - Berlin, Technische Universität/Zentrum für Antisemitismusforschung, 2002)
 Müller, Jürgen: Nationalsozialismus in Lateinamerika : die Auslandsorganisation der NSDAP in Argentinien, Brasilien, Chile und Mexiko, 1931 - 1945. - Stuttgart : Akademischer Verlag Heinz, 1997. - 566 p. : ill. - (Historamericana; 3). - . - (Originally presented as the author's thesis (doctoral) - Heidelberg, 1994/95). - EUR 34,50
 National Socialism. Basic principles, their application by the Nazi Party's foreign organization, and the use of Germans abroad for Nazi aims / Prepared in the Special Unit of the Division of European Affairs by Raymond E. Murphy, Francis B. Stevens, Howard Trivers, Joseph M. Roland. - Washington : United States of America, Department of State, 1943. - pp. vi. 510.

External links
 Nuremberg Trial Proceedings, 90th day, Monday, 25 March 1946, testimony of Ernst Wilhelm Bohle (search for "bohle")
 6. Reichstagung der Auslandsdeutschen in Stuttgart vom 28. August bis 4. September (1938) Film of the 6th Congress of the NSDAP/AO in Stuttgart, 1938

1931 establishments in Germany
Diaspora organizations of political parties
Foreign relations of Nazi Germany
Nazi Gaue
Nazi Party organizations
Organizations established in 1931